Judo was contested at the 2011 Parapan American Games from November 18 to 20 at the Multipurpose Gymnasium in Guadalajara, Mexico.

Medal summary

Medal table

Medal events

Women

Men

External links
 
 2011 Parapan American Games – Judo

Events at the 2011 Parapan American Games
2011
American Games,Para